Stefano Zanatta (born 28 January 1964) is a former Italian racing cyclist. He rode in fourteen Grand Tours between 1986 and 1995.

References

External links
 

1964 births
Living people
Italian male cyclists
Sportspeople from Treviso
Cyclists from the Province of Treviso